Sándor László (4 March 1925 – September 2002) was a Hungarian racewalker. He competed in the men's 50 kilometres walk at the 1948 Summer Olympics and the 1952 Summer Olympics.

References

1925 births
2002 deaths
Athletes (track and field) at the 1948 Summer Olympics
Athletes (track and field) at the 1952 Summer Olympics
Hungarian male racewalkers
Olympic athletes of Hungary
Place of birth missing